The Union of Welsh Independents is a Reformed congregationalist denomination in Wales.

History 

Welsh congregational churches or Independents stand in the Puritan tradition. The first congregational congregation was founded at Llanfaches in 1639. Early founders were in the puritan tradition. Later several churches were founded and formed separate denominations. They embraced different theological positions. Finally the denomination was founded in 1872 as a voluntary association of churches. They called it Independent because each congregation claims to be under the authority of Christ. Individual congregations cooperate through associations. Now the Union works through six departments: finance, mission, ministry, education, churches, communication. The Union churches have much in common with other free churches in Wales. Ministers can freely move their ministry among them. The Unions council met once a year. The Union is a free and voluntary body, its aims to help to make churches a fellowship that serve Jesus Christ. The church has high emphasis on preaching the Gospel, and education, empowering church members. The denomination currently is working on a new mission strategy, the AGAPE program, started in 2005. The latest strategy is the Welsh Independents Development Programme.

Statistics 
In 2006 it had 16 associations of churches, 450 congregations, 31,000 members and about 107 ministers.  Its worship services are held primarily in the Welsh language.

According to the latest statistics in 2021 it had over 400 congregations. The president is Beti-Wyn James.

Interchurch relations 
The Union is a member of the World Communion of Reformed Churches. Also a member in the International Congregational Fellowship, Council for World Mission and the World Council of Churches.

It has friendly relations with the Congregational Federation.

References

External links 
 Union of Wales Independents official site

Members of the World Communion of Reformed Churches
Reformed denominations in the United Kingdom
Christian denominations in the United Kingdom
Congregationalism